The Church of the Life-Giving Trinity is an Eastern Orthodox church in Jongbaek-dong, Rangrang District in Pyongyang, North Korea. It is the first and only Orthodox church in the country, and one of only a handful of Christian churches there overall.

History
Kim Jong-il reportedly wanted to construct an Eastern Orthodox church in North Korea after a trip to the Russian Far East in 2002. Kim had visited the St. Innocent of Irkutsk Church in Khabarovsk on 22 August and admired its architecture and Russian Orthodox rites. A Russian diplomat asked Kim Jong-il whether there were any Orthodox believers in Pyongyang, and Kim replied that believers would be found.

There were no Eastern Orthodox priests in the country, so the  established in 2002 contacted the Russian Orthodox Church. The committee sent four students to the Moscow Ecclesiastical Seminary in April 2003. All four were freshly baptized Christians who had formerly worked for the North Korean intelligence service. One of them, Feodor Kim (Kim Hoe-il), said it was difficult for them to adopt the Orthodox faith. After the seminary, they were dispatched to Vladivostok to gain practical experience.

The groundbreaking ceremony was held on 24 June 2003. The church was dedicated on 13 August 2006 in the presence of Russian religious and political leaders.

Worship
The church is presided over by rector Feodor Kim (Kim Hoe-il) and deacon John Ra (Ra Gwan-chol), graduates of the theological seminary in Moscow.

The church has a parish of its own and is under the Patriarchate of Moscow and All Russia. However, the Korean Orthodox Church claims Eastern Orthodox Church in North Korea are part of the Korean Orthodox Church.

The church also has a Holy Trinity Icon.

Very few locals attend.

See also
Religion in North Korea
Korean Orthodox Church in South Korea
Church of the Life-Giving Trinity (disambiguation)
Orthodoxy in Korea

References

External links

Korean Eparchy of the Moscow Patriarchate
Korean Orthodox Church Becomes Separate Metropolis; Begins Dialogue With New Orthodox Group in North Korea
Russian Orthodox Christians celebrate Pentecost in Pyongyang
Делегация Русской Православной Церкви приняла участие в торжествах по случаю пятилетия освящения Троицкого храма в Пхеньяне 
Православный Храм Святой Живоначальной Троицы В Пхеньяне 
Русский священник в Пхеньяне радуется за северокорейцев – жить сложно, но они истинные патриоты 
"Bells of an Orthodox Church Ring" at Naenara

2006 establishments in North Korea
Russian Orthodox church buildings in North Korea
Buildings and structures in Pyongyang
Churches completed in 2007
Christian organizations established in 2007
North Korea–Russia relations